The Odds Against Her is a 1919 British silent drama film directed by Alexander Butler and starring Milton Rosmer, Edna Dormeuil and Lorna Della. It was made at Ealing Studios.

Cast
 Milton Rosmer as Leo Strathmore
 Edna Dormeuil as Nanette
 Lorna Della as Lolita Rios
 George Foley as The Baron
 Thomas H. MacDonald
 Nancy Kenyon
 Vernon Davidson
 André Randall

References

Bibliography
 Bamford, Kenton. Distorted Images: British National Identity and Film in the 1920s. I.B. Tauris, 1999.
 Low, Rachael. History of the British Film, 1918-1929. George Allen & Unwin, 1971.

External links

1919 films
1919 drama films
British drama films
British silent feature films
Films directed by Alexander Butler
Ealing Studios films
British black-and-white films
1910s English-language films
1910s British films
Silent drama films